Kanthal may refer to :

 the historical name of Pratapgarh State, a princely state in India, until it was renamed after its capital Prtabgarh in 1698 
 Kanthal (alloy), an industrial material